Rachavetivaripalle is a gram panchayat in Nimmanapalle, Chittoor district, in the Indian state of Andhra Pradesh.

Geography 

Climate

Politics
Rachavetivaripalle is in Madanapalle assembly constituency in Andhra Pradesh and the constituency number is 283.

See also 
 List of cities in Andhra Pradesh by population
 List of municipalities in Andhra Pradesh

References

Villages in Chittoor district
Mandal headquarters in Chittoor district